The Qigu Formation is a Late Jurassic (Oxfordian) geologic formation in the Southern Junggar Basin in China. Indeterminate Dinosaur remains are among the fossils that have been recovered from the formation, including theropod teeth and a fibula. a stegosaur dorsal vertebra and a Eusauropod tooth. Xinjiangtitan was erroneously thought to be from this formation, but it is actually from the older Qiketai Formation, which is in a different basin. The term "Qigu Formation" is also used to sediments of equivalent age in the Turpan Basin, but this might better be treated as a separate formation. It is laterally equivalent to the Shishugou Formation.

Fossil content 
The mass accumulation of Jurassic freshwater turtle fossils belonging to the genus Annemys, discovered in 2009 at a site nicknamed "Mesa Chelonia" in Shanshan County, Xinjiang is thought to likely belong to the Qigu Formation, though it belongs to the strata of the Turpan Basin. Remains of indeterminate dinosaurs, including ankylosaurs, metriacanthosaurids, and dromaeosaurids are known from the formation.

The remains of indeterminate rhamphorhynchid pterosaurs have been recovered from the formation. Among others, the following fossils have been found in the formation:

See also 
 List of dinosaur-bearing rock formations
 List of pterosaur-bearing stratigraphic units

References

Bibliography 
 

Geologic formations of China
Jurassic System of Asia
Oxfordian Stage
Jurassic China
Siltstone formations
Sandstone formations
Alluvial deposits
Fluvial deposits
Lacustrine deposits
Paleontology in Xinjiang
Formations